James M. "Jamie" Gallagher (born March 7, 1981) is a Republican American politician currently serving in the California State Assembly.  He represents the Assembly District #3, located in the northern Sacramento Valley.  As of February 8, 2022, he was voted by the Assembly Republican Caucus as the Minority Leader of the California State Assembly.

Background 
Gallagher is the descendant of Irish immigrants who settled northern California in the early 1800s.  His paternal grandfather, Robert Gallagher, served four years (1985–89) on the Sutter County Board of Supervisors.

Education 
After graduating from East Nicolaus High School, Gallagher earned a bachelor's degree in political science from UC Berkeley. 
 Gallagher earned a JD degree from UC Davis.

Career 
Gallagher's political career began he worked for state Assemblyman Doug LaMalfa as a fellow in a Fellowship Program.

Since 2007, Gallagher has been practicing law. He is a partner in his family's fifth generation rice and walnut farming operation. In 2008, Gallagher was elected to the Sutter County Board of Supervisors, where he served until his election to the state Assembly.

On November 4, 2014, Gallagher won the election and succeeded fellow Republican Dan Logue, who ran unsuccessfully for Congress that year. Gallagher is a Republican representing the California's 3rd State Assembly district, encompassing western parts of the Sacramento Valley.
In 2017, Gallagher became the Republican Caucus Chairman of the California General Assembly.

2014 California State Assembly

2016 California State Assembly candidacy

2018 California State Assembly candidacy

2020 California State Assembly candidacy

Personal life 
Gallagher's wife is Janna, they met in kindergarten while attending Browns School in Rio Oso, CA. They have five children.

See also 
 Doug LaMalfa
 Jim Nielsen

References

External links 
 
 gallagher Campaign website
 James Gallagher at open states.org

1981 births
21st-century American politicians
County supervisors in California
Living people
Republican Party members of the California State Assembly
People from Sutter County, California